Ruabon railway station is a combined rail and bus interchange serving Ruabon, Wrexham County Borough, Wales. It is the second busiest station in Wrexham County Borough in terms of passenger journeys, after the mainline station, Wrexham General. It is on the Shrewsbury to Chester Line, which is part of the former Great Western Railway mainline route from London Paddington to Birkenhead Woodside which lasted until 1967.

History

Ruabon station was originally larger than at present, with an extensive marshalling yard with a turntable and goods depot accompanying it, and was the terminus of the Ruabon to Barmouth line which ran via Llangollen, Corwen and Dolgellau. This branch line was a victim of the Beeching cuts in the 1960s, closing to passengers in 1965 and completely three years later. The bay platform serving this route can still be seen at the station, whilst the old goods yard has been redeveloped as a housing estate.

The original station building was Italianate in style and was designed by the architect Thomas Penson and opened on 4 November 1846. However, this was replaced by the current neo-Tudor style stone buildings, designed by Henry Robertson, in 1860. In 1870, refreshment rooms were added between the platforms serving Chester and Barmouth.

Following further cuts in the national railway service, Ruabon station became an unstaffed halt in 1974.  Only parts of both main platforms are now in use.

In 2009, Ruabon station was refurbished at a cost of £70,000.  New shelters, lighting and passenger information system screens were provided as part of the Welsh Assembly-funded project.

Facilities
As noted, the station is unmanned but has a ticket vending machine where tickets must be purchased or collected before boarding. The main buildings on platform 2 are privately occupied.  Train running information is offered via digital displays, automatic announcements, timetable posters and customer help points on each platform.  Step-free access is only provided on platform 2, as platform 1 can only be reached via a footbridge with stairs. Ruabon Station is the only station on the Chester-Shrewsbury Line without step-free access. The stairs cause major problems for the disabled with passengers wishing to alight here being advised to go to Wrexham and return on the next train south. Access for those with prams and pushchairs is also very difficult if not impossible and a struggle for those with luggage or those less mobile.

Services
Currently, trains run on two routes operated by Transport for Wales:
 1tph to Wrexham General; usually continues to Chester and Holyhead

 1tph to Shrewsbury; usually continues to either Birmingham International or Cardiff Central via  (two-hourly to each)
A two-hourly service operates on Sundays to Chester and Birmingham International, with limited additional services to Cardiff and Holyhead.

Until January 2011 the Wrexham, Shropshire and Marylebone Railway provided regular daily services between Wrexham and London. This service ceased due to a continuing loss being made by the company.

Connections 
A small number of local buses serve the station.

References

Further reading

External links 

 Chester to Shrewsbury Rail Partnership

Railway stations in Wrexham County Borough
DfT Category F1 stations
Former Great Western Railway stations
Railway stations in Great Britain opened in 1846
Railway stations served by Transport for Wales Rail
Ruabon
1846 establishments in Wales
Thomas Mainwaring Penson railway stations
Grade II listed buildings in Wrexham County Borough
Grade II listed railway stations in Wales